Vuokatti is an urban area that is a physically separate part of the municipality of Sotkamo, Finland. It is home to more than 6,000 inhabitants, making it the second most populous urban area in the region of Kainuu, after the main urban area of the municipality of Kajaani. Vuokatti is also the name of the nearby forested hill range and the urban area's train station.

The highest hill in the area is the 345 meter high Porttivaara, the second highest being Vuokatinvaara.

Vuokatti has a ski resort, sports academy, and the Katinkulta resort. There is also a skiing tunnel, which makes cross-country skiing possible in all seasons, and there are also snowboarding and snowtubing tunnels.

Vuokatti has a national Olympic Training Center for winter sports such as Cross-Country skiing, Biathlon and Nordic Combined. 

Vuokatti has hosted multiple international sports events like the European Youth Olympic Days in 2001, Orienteering World Championships in 2013 and Nordic Junior World Ski Championships in 2021. Vuokatti will host the European Youth Olympic Festival in 2022.

References

External links
Vuokatti

Villages in Finland
Geography of Kainuu
Tourist attractions in Kainuu
Sotkamo